David Mansfield (born September 13, 1956) is an American musician and composer.

Mansfield was raised in Leonia, New Jersey. His father, Newton Mansfield was a first violinist in the New York Philharmonic. David played guitar, pedal steel guitar and fiddle in his first band, called Quacky Duck and His Barnyard Friends, which also included two sons of Tony Bennett.

Bob Dylan asked Mansfield to tour with him on his 1975 Rolling Thunder Revue tour; he remained in Dylan's band through their 1978 world tour.

After the Revue ended in 1976, Mansfield and two other members of Dylan's band, T-Bone Burnett and Steven Soles, formed The Alpha Band. The band released three albums, The Alpha Band in 1977, Spark in the Dark in 1977, and The Statue Makers of Hollywood in 1978. While Mansfield in 1978 was working on the album, The Statue Makers of Hollywood with The Alpha Band, he appeared as a guitarist on Desire Wire by a struggling pop/rock artist Cindy Bullens that same year.

In 1986, Mansfield was an initial member of Bruce Hornsby and the Range, including playing the title instrument on the hit "Mandolin Rain".  However, he left the Range before their first tour.

Since The Alpha Band broke up, Mansfield has continued to work as a musician in sessions for Dylan, Burnett, Johnny Cash, Nanci Griffith, Roger McGuinn, Sam Phillips, Mark Heard, The Roches, Edie Brickell, Spinal Tap, Lucinda Williams, Dwight Yoakam, Victoria Williams, Loudon Wainwright III, Willie Nile, Chris Hillman and Herb Pedersen and others.

Mansfield composed the music for the 1980 film Heaven's Gate – he appeared in the movie, playing the fiddle on roller skates – and has since gone on to write scores for a number of other films, including others directed by Heaven's Gate's Michael Cimino.  Mansfield cobbled together the soundtrack album for Songcatcher. He also composed the music for the soundtrack to The Ballad of Little Jo (1993), a movie written and directed by Maggie Greenwald, whom he married in 1994. Together they adopted two children. Maisie Mansfield-Greenwald (1997) and Lulu Mansfield-Greenwald (2000). He also composed the score with Van Dyke Parks for Walter Hill's Broken Trail (2006), and they were nominated for a Primetime Emmy Award for Outstanding Music Composition for a Miniseries, Movie or a Special (Original Dramatic Score).

Filmography
1980	Heaven's Gate
1985	Year of the Dragon
1986	Club Paradise
1987	The Sicilian
1989	Miss Firecracker
1990	Desperate Hours
1991	Late for Dinner
1992   Me and Veronica
1993	The Ballad of Little Jo
1995   Outlaws: The Legend of O.B. Taggart
1996   Deep Crimson
1997   Floating
1997   Road Ends
1997	The Apostle
1998   El evangelio de las maravillas
1998	Dark Harbor
1999	Tumbleweeds
1999   No One Writes to the Colonel
2000   Such Is Life
2000   Ropewalk
2000	A Good Baby
2000	Songcatcher
2002	Divine Secrets of the Ya-Ya Sisterhood
2003   Flora's Garment Bursting Into Bloom
2005	Transamerica
2006	Stephanie Daley
2006	Diggers
2006   El carnaval de Sodoma
2007	Then She Found Me
2008	The Guitar
2011	Certainty
2011   The Reasons of the Heart
2013	The Last Keepers
2016   Sophie and the Rising Sun
2019   Devil Between the Legs

References

External links
David Mansfield Official Website 

1956 births
American blues guitarists
American fiddlers
American film score composers
American folk guitarists
American male guitarists
American rock guitarists
Place of birth missing (living people)
Bruce Hornsby and the Range members
Living people
Guitarists from New Jersey
Pedal steel guitarists
People from Leonia, New Jersey
20th-century American guitarists
American male film score composers
21st-century violinists
Varèse Sarabande Records artists